Proctoporus otishi is a species of lizard in the family Gymnophthalmidae. It is endemic to Peru.

References

Proctoporus
Reptiles of Peru
Endemic fauna of Peru
Reptiles described in 2022